The 1896 Navy Midshipmen football team represented the United States Naval Academy during the 1896 college football season. In their first and only season under head coach Johnny Poe, the Midshipmen compiled a 5–3 record and outscored their opponents by a combined score of 180 to 53. The Army–Navy Game was canceled due to Presidential cabinet order.

Schedule

References

Navy
Navy Midshipmen football seasons
Navy Midshipmen football